Oliver Glacier is a glacier located on the northeast coast of the Baffin Mountains on Baffin Island, Nunavut, Canada. It is just outside Sirmilik National Park.

See also
List of glaciers
Whakawhiti Saddle

References

Glaciers of Baffin Island
Arctic Cordillera